"Summer Love" is a song by Australian pop group, Sherbet and was released in March 1975. It became their first number-one hit on the Australian Kent Music Report Singles Chart. The song was promoted on the newly aired ABC TV pop series, Countdown, which gave it wide exposure. From early 1975 the group made more appearances on the show than any other band in the programme's history. In October, at the King of Pop Awards, "Summer Love" won the Most Popular Australian Single, the band won Most Popular Australian Group and their lead singer, Daryl Braithwaite, won the King of Pop award.

On the Kent Music Report's 1975 End of the Year Singles Chart it appeared at No. 4 and was the highest placed single by an Australian artist. "Summer Love" was the first Sherbet single issued in the United Kingdom, and was their only release on EMI. Sherbet had signed a one-off deal for "Summer Love" with EMI – rival to their regular label Festival Records. This was a ploy to gain leverage when negotiating a more favourable contract. After "Summer Love" peaked at No. 1, Sherbet re-signed with Festival which issued their subsequent material on the group's own Razzle and Sherbet labels. The B-side was "(You Go Your Way) I'll Go Mine", which was written by the band's bass guitarist, Tony Mitchell. Braithwaite covered "Summer Love" as a solo artist. In March 2001 it was performed live by an ensemble group – which included a reunited Sherbet – at the Gimme Ted tribute and benefit concert for fellow 1970s artist, Ted Mulry.

Track listing

Charts

Weekly charts

Year-end charts

Personnel
Sherbet members
 Daryl Braithwaite – lead vocals
 Tony Mitchell – bass guitar, backing vocals
 Garth Porter – keyboards, piano, backing vocals
 Clive Shakespeare – guitar, backing vocals
 Alan Sandow – drums, percussion

References

General
  Note: Archived [on-line] copy has limited functionality.
Specific

1975 singles
Number-one singles in Australia
Sherbet (band) songs
David Tavaré songs
2006 singles
1975 songs
Songs written by Garth Porter
Songs written by Clive Shakespeare